Personal protective equipment serves an integral role in maintaining the safety of an athlete participating in a sport. The usage and development of protective gear in sports has evolved through time, and continues to advance over time. Many sports league or professional sports mandate the provision and usage of protective gear for athletes in the sport. Usage of protective gear is also mandated in college athletics and occasionally in amateur sports.

American football

 football helmet
 eyeshield
 rib protector
 shoulder pads
 jockstrap with or without a cup pocket and protective cup
 hip, tail, thigh, knee pads
 mouthguard
 Gloves : Gloves can help a receiver keep his hands more warm and protected in poor weather.
 cleats/shoes

Association football

 jockstrap with or without a cup pocket and protective cup
 shin guards

Auto racing
 Racing helmet
 Fire suit
 Head and neck restraint

Baseball
 batting helmet
 Gloves
 batting gloves
 cleats
 Shin, elbow, upper arm guards
 Hand and wrist guard for runners
 chest protectors, shin guards, and a helmet with a face mask for catchers
 jockstrap with a cup pocket and protective cup

Basketball
Protective sports glasses or sports goggles, which are also available with prescription lenses.
jockstrap (optional)

Bowling
 Bowling Gloves optional

Cycling
 jockstrap (optional)
 jockstrap with a cup pocket and protective cup for mountain biking
 spandex shorts
 helmet

Cricket

 Helmet
 Leg pads
 Arm guard
 Jockstrap with a cup pocket and protective cup
 Gloves (for batting and wicketkeeping) 
 Thigh pad

Extreme sports
 jockstrap with a cup pocket and protective cup

Fencing
 Mask
 Jacket
 Chest Protector
 Plastron
 Breeches
 Glove
 Socks
jockstrap with a cup pocket and protective cup

Figure skating
pole harness

Golf
Clothes
Club(s)
Glove(s) (Not necessary and usually only worn on the opposite to dominant hand)

Gymnastics
jockstrap

Field hockey 
 shin guards
 mouthguard
 Helmet (Goalkeeper)
 Padding (Goalkeeper)
jockstrap with a cup pocket and protective cup

Horse racing
 Hat
 Body Protector
 Boots
 Gloves
 Breeches
jockstrap 
 Goggles

Ice hockey

 Shin guards
 Mouthguard
 Helmet
 Shoulder pads
 Elbow pads
Jock (males) or jill (females)
Ice pants or protective girdle
Neck guard
Gloves
Specialized protective equipment for goalkeepers (Mask, pants, chest protector, leg pads, skates with toe protection, blocker, catcher, hockey jock or jill)

Martial arts
jockstrap with a cup pocket and protective cup
High Gear suit
Compression shorts
bandage
Mouth guard

Racquet sports
jockstrap with a cup pocket and protective cup

In Squash: 
Goggles to protect the eyes from the ball

Rugby union
All Optional: 
 Mouthguard
 Underguards (pads)
 Headguard

Underwater Hockey
 Helmet
 Gloves 
 Mouthguard
 Twin-lens diving mask

Volleyball
 Knee pads
 Elbow pads
 Palm guards
 Anklets

References

Protective gear